"R2 Come Home" and "Lethal Trackdown" are the final two episodes of the second season in the Cartoon Network animated television series Star Wars: The Clone Wars. The twenty-first and twenty-second episodes, entitled "R2 Come Home" and "Lethal Trackdown", were first aired on April 30, 2010 and attracted an average of 2.756 million viewers during the original broadcast. The finale is significant for ending "with twin fandom bangs, courtesy of Boba Fett and a mammoth beast inspired by Godzilla." Fett's entrance in the series commemorates the 30-year anniversary of the character's appearance in the 1980 film The Empire Strikes Back.

Plot
Anakin Skywalker and Mace Windu are trapped in the crumbling ruins of a crashed ship while searching for survivors, and only R2-D2 can get out a message to save them – if he can elude vicious gundarks and, worse yet, a crew of determined bounty hunters led by Boba Fett and Aurra Sing.

While Anakin and Mace Windu recover from their injuries, Plo Koon and Ahsoka tracks down Boba Fett from the underworld of Coruscant to the planet Florrum. Boba's revenge scheme finally leads to a climactic battle, and the life of a Republic admiral hangs in the balance.

Critical response

IGN reviewer Eric Goldman rated the first episode 8.2/10 and the second 8.8/10, stating "this was a very layered, exciting episode to end Season 2 on", though he did not appreciate Boba Fett's limited dialogue. Bryan Young, a writer for The Huffington Post and Examiner.com, also disliked Fett's responses at the end of the episode when confronting Mace Windu: "He says something incredibly whiny." Young does state, however, that "[o]verall, this pair of episodes was a satisfying conclusion to season two, which really upped the game in this series in terms of animation, storytelling and suspense." GalacticBinder.com's reviewer Chris Smith wrote, "Lucasfilm delivers another exciting episode to finish off a tremendous second season." Adam Rosenberg writing in MTV Movies Blog discusses Boba Fett's return: "He's going to have to be put through a lot more hell before he embraces his inner badass. I'll say though... he's off to a mighty good start with the dual blasters he wears on his belt. Sure, they're almost the size of his thighs, but hey... he's still just a kid."

References

External links
 
 
 
 

Star Wars: The Clone Wars (2008 TV series) episodes
2010 American television episodes
Television episodes about revenge
Television shows directed by Dave Filoni